Guy Armand de Gramont, Count of Guiche (25 November 163729 November 1673), was a French nobleman, adventurer and one of the greatest playboys of the 17th century.

He was the son of Marshal Duke Antoine III de Gramont and Françoise-Marguerite du Plessis de Chivré, Richelieu's niece. His sister was Catherine Charlotte, (1639–1678), Princess of Monaco and one time mistress of Louis XIV of France.

Armand was bisexual.  He was part of the entourage of Philippe de France, who was bisexual, where many reckoned him the handsomest man at court. He was known for being vain, overbearing, and somewhat contemptuous, but many lovers of both sexes often overlooked these flaws. It is generally accepted that he became the lover of Princess Henrietta, Philippe's wife, but for a time he also paid court to Louise de La Vallière.

Guiche was, however, not sufficiently enamored with Louise to challenge King Louis XIV's affections for her. He was exiled in 1662 for conspiring with the jealous Henrietta to drive a wedge between Louis XIV and Louise.

He then fought against the Turks for Poland and against the English for the Dutch, and eventually returned to France in 1669.

He returned to court in 1671. In 1672, he joined Louis XIV and the Great Condé in the Franco-Dutch war and covered himself in glory when he swam across the Rhine, and the whole army followed his example.

He died on November 29, 1673.

Portrayals in literature

The Comte de Guiche appears in Alexandre Dumas's novels Twenty Years After and The Vicomte de Bragelonne, where he is portrayed as the closest friend of Raoul, son of the musketeer Athos. In the latter novel, he is included in the entourage of Prince Philippe, and takes a central part in the tangled web of romantic intrigues which engulf the court.

References

See also 
Gramont

Gramont, Armand Comte de Guiche
Gramont, Armand Comte de Guiche
Bisexual men
Counts of Guiche
LGBT Roman Catholics
French bisexual people
17th-century French LGBT people